is a private university in Kyoto, Kyoto, Japan. The school's predecessor was founded in 1884. It was chartered as a university in 1949. Because it trains pharmacist-scientists, pharmacists that also possess research skills, Kyoto Pharmaceutical University has laboratories in a wide range of fields. Each laboratory has about 10 members that focus on their research. Students perform research for their pharmaceutical specializations.

External links
 Official website

Educational institutions established in 1884
Private universities and colleges in Japan
Universities and colleges in Kyoto Prefecture
Kansai Collegiate American Football League
1884 establishments in Japan